MSPE Character Folder is a 1984 role-playing game supplement published by Flying Buffalo for Mercenaries, Spies and Private Eyes.

Contents
MSPE Character Folder are a pack of 20 character sheets that fold up to form a wallet for holding notes and clues.

Reception
W.G. Armintrout reviewed MSPE Character Folder in Space Gamer No. 67. Armintrout commented that "I'm not usually one to go gaga about character sheets, but these are good – they give you somewhere to put things and fold down to a convenient size."

Reviews
Dragon #94 (Feb., 1985)

References

Character sheets
Mercenaries, Spies and Private Eyes
Role-playing game supplements introduced in 1984